The St. Edmundsbury Football League was a football competition based around the town of Bury St Edmunds in Suffolk,  England. At various points it had up to four divisions and sits at level 18 of the English football league system.

The league was affiliated to the Suffolk County FA.

History

The league was founded in 1907 and for most of its history has been known as the Bury & District Football League.  In its early years the league had a much higher status and served a good standard of football in the West Suffolk area.  However, in the last 25 years those clubs with better facilities left the league for higher standard competitions with Bacton Utd 89, Bartons, Cockfield Utd, Elmswell, Sporting 87, Stanton, St. Edmunds 65, Thurston, Walsham-le-Willows moving to the Suffolk and Ipswich Football League and Barton Mills, Exning Athletic, Lakenheath, Tuddenham Rovers and West Row Gunners moving to the Cambridgeshire League.

As a consequence there was a significant reduction in the number of divisions from three in the 1990s to two over the last decade (with the exception of 2006–07) and eventually just one division.  At the same time the number of teams participating in the league has halved from around 40 teams in the 1990s to 20 teams in the 2011–12 season. The league temporarily re-added Division Three for the 2014–15 season.

In 2007 the Bury & District Football League celebrated its centenary and in the same year made the decision to rename the league as the St. Edmundsbury Football League.

Among the clubs that at one time played in the Bury & District Football League and now compete at a higher level are:

Cambridge City (known as Cambridge Town)
Cornard United
Mildenhall Town
Newmarket Town
Sudbury Town
Walsham-le-Willows

Many of the remaining clubs had very basic changing and pitch facilities and in later years the Division One Champions had not taken advantage of seeking promotion to the Suffolk and Ipswich League competition. This trend was broken by the 2011–12 champions Bartons, who moved to Division Three of the Suffolk and Ipswich League for the 2012–13 season.  Bartons subsequently gained promotion from Division Three to the Suffolk and Ipswich League Division Two in their first season.

Final member clubs
Beck Row
Bury Town Rams 'A'
RF Saints
St Edmunds 1965
Vipers
Walsham-le-Willows 'A'
Walsham-le-Willows 'B'

Divisional champions

Knock-Out Cup winners

Thetford & District Football League Challenge Cup
Founded in 1905, presented by the first president G.H.Verrall, renamed 1907 Bury Junior & District Football League

References

External links
League website
Wickhambrook F.C.

 
Football in Suffolk
Bury St Edmunds
Sports leagues established in 1907
1907 establishments in England
2019 disestablishments in England
Defunct football leagues in England